Marvin's Marvelous Mechanical Museum, located in Farmington Hills, Michigan, is an arcade/museum devoted to a large collection of coin-operated animatronic dummies, mechanical games and other oddities. Exhibits include, for example, the classic gypsy Fortune teller machine that used to grace many a carnival sideshow. Most of the machines still function, so visitors are encouraged to bring change. Marvin's is open 365 days a year.  

The museum's founder, Marvin Yagoda, had been collecting the items that populate the  museum for over 60 years. He graduated from the University of Michigan in Ann Arbor as a pharmacist taking over his father's store, Sam's Drugs in Detroit.  Yagoda was a recognized expert in the field of mechanical and electrical game apparatus; he has been involved in appraisal of such items for the television series American Pickers. Yagoda died on January 8, 2017, at the age of 78. Marvin's son Jeremy grew up in the business and carries on his father's legacy.

Amongst the collection is P. T. Barnum's replica of the Cardiff Giant, one of Sing Sing Prison's electric chairs in which 30 people died,  and an automaton "food inspector" is set up to continuously vomit into a pile of milk bottles. There are also various modern coin-op arcade games, and a prize counter to exchange tickets.

In popular culture
Tally Hall, a band from nearby Ann Arbor, titled an album after the museum.  Tally Hall was the name of the shopping mall where Marvin's Marvelous Mechanical Museum existed before the indoor mall was converted to an outdoor strip mall in the late 1980s.

See also

List of magic museums

Notes

External links
 Marvin's Marvelous Mechanical Museum – official site
 Marvin's Marvelous Mechanical Museum June 30, 2009 at Wayback Machine
 Marvin's Marvelous Mechanical Museum spot on American Pickers television show via YouTube
 Marvin's Marvelous Mechanical Museum via YouTube
 Marvin's Marvelous Mechanical Museum via Twitter
 Marvin's Marvelous Mechanical Museum via Instagram

Amusement museums in the United States
Animatronic attractions
Commercial machines
Farmington Hills, Michigan
Museums in Oakland County, Michigan